2032 is the twelfth studio album by Gong and the ninth album by the Daevid Allen version of the group, released on .

Overview 
2032 is a further installment of the Gong mythology, the central part of which was formed with the Radio Gnome Trilogy of albums, comprising Flying Teapot in 1973, followed by Angel's Egg, 1973, and You in 1974.

While later Gong albums in the 1970s onwards did refer to elements of the Gong mythology, they were not seen as succeeding the Radio Gnome Trilogy in the same way as 2032.

The year 2032 is mentioned quite often in Daevid Allen's early Gong mythology writings.

The album brings together again many of the Radio Gnome Trilogy era Gong lineup, specifically Daevid Allen, Steve Hillage, Gilli Smyth, Miquette Giraudy, Mike Howlett, and Didier Malherbe.

The album describes how the heretofore invisible Planet Gong, home of the pot head pixies and octave doctors, will finally make contact with Earth in the year 2032.

The album's main themes are world peace and ecology.

Recording 
Recorded at A-Wave Studio in London, it was produced and mixed by Steve Hillage, with additional production by Daevid Allen at the Bananamoon Observatory in New South Wales in Australia.

Release 
The album is available in CD and a limited edition double LP format. The double LP comes with an LP size booklet with lyrics, and a poster portraying the numerals 2032.

Cover 
The cover of the album is a stylised 0 (zero) based on artwork by Daevid Allen, referencing "Zero the Hero" of the earlier 1973-1974 Trilogy.

Track listing

Personnel 
Gong
Daevid Allen – voice, guitar
Steve Hillage – guitar
Gilli Smyth – voice, space whisper
Miquette Giraudy – synthesisers
Mike Howlett – bass
Chris Taylor – drums
Theo Travis – sax and flute
Former Gong
Didier Malherbe – duduk, sax and flute
Additional personnel
Yuji Katsui – electric violin
Elliet Mackrell – violin
Stefanie Petrik – backing vocals

References

2009 albums
Concept albums
Gong (band) albums
Jazz albums by British artists
Progressive rock albums by British artists